Adenarake is a genus of flowering plants belonging to the family Ochnaceae.

Its native range is Venezuela.

Species:

Adenarake macrocarpa 
Adenarake muriculata

References

Ochnaceae
Malpighiales genera